Marvin Hiram Hawley (June 1875 – April 28, 1904) was an American pitcher in Major League Baseball. He played for the Boston Beaneaters of the National League in one game on September 22, 1894.

External links

1875 births
1904 deaths
19th-century baseball players
Major League Baseball pitchers
Boston Beaneaters players
Twin Cities Twins players
Kenton Babes players
Newport Colts players
Baseball players from Ohio
People from Painesville, Ohio